Yago Dzhumberovich Abuladze (born 16 October 1997) is a Russian judoka. He won the gold medal in the men's 60 kg event at the 2021 World Judo Championships held in Budapest, Hungary.

In 2020, he won the silver medal in the men's 60 kg event at the European Judo Championships held in Prague, Czech Republic.

Career
He won the silver medal in the men's 60 kg event at the 2017 European U23 Judo Championships held in Podgorica, Montenegro. In 2018, he won the gold medal in this event at the European U23 Judo Championships held in Győr, Hungary.

In 2020, he won the silver medal in his event at the Judo Grand Slam Paris in Paris, France and the gold medal in his event at the 2020 Judo Grand Slam Hungary in Budapest, Hungary.

In 2021, he competed in the men's 60 kg event at the Judo World Masters held in Doha, Qatar. A few months later, he won one of the bronze medals in the men's 60 kg event at the 2021 European Judo Championships held in Lisbon, Portugal.

Achievements

References

External links
 

Living people
1997 births
Place of birth missing (living people)
Russian male judoka
Russian sportspeople of Georgian descent
World judo champions
21st-century Russian people